Limnaecia enclista is a moth in the family Cosmopterigidae. It is found on Java.

References

Natural History Museum Lepidoptera generic names catalog

Limnaecia
Moths described in 1921
Taxa named by Edward Meyrick
Moths of Indonesia